The Calculator-Based Laboratory (CBL) is a mobile data collection device manufactured by Texas Instruments in collaboration with Vernier Software & Technology and introduced in 1994. The CBL can be used to collect data either in conjunction with a TI graphing calculator, or on its own.

See also
HP Mobile Calculating Lab (MCL)
HP StreamSmart 400
HP StreamSmart 410

References

Texas Instruments